Keshav is an South asian male given name which is a modern form of name Keshava, one of the many names of Lord Krishna and Lord Vishnu. Notable people with the name include:

 Keshav Bansal (born 1991), Indian entrepreneur 
 Keshav Vaman Bhole (1896–1967), Indian musical composer
 Keshav Kumar Budhathoki, Nepalese politician
 Keshav Dutt (1925–2021), Indian field hockey player
 Keshav Ginde (born 1942), Indian flautist
 Keshav Prasad Goenka (1912–1983), Indian businessman
 Keshav Baliram Hedgewar (1889–1940), Indian chief
 Keshav Rao Jadhav (1933–2018), Indian activist
 Keshav Rao Koratkar (1867–1932), Indian pioneer
 Keshav Kumar (born 1988), Indian cricketer
 Keshav Maharaj (1990), South African cricketer
 Keshav Prasad Mainali, Nepalese politician
 Keshav Malik (1924–2014), Indian poet
 Keshav Dev Malviya (1904–1981), Indian political leader
 Keshav Mangave (1926–1997), Indian wrestler
 Keshav Prasad Maurya (born 1969), Indian politician
 Keshav Meshram (1937–2007), Marathi poet
 Keshav R. Murugesh (born 1963), Indian executive officer
 Keshav Dattatreya Nayak, Indian scientist
 Keshav Pandit (died 1690), Sanskrit scholar and poet
 Keshav K Pingali, American computer scientist
 Keshav Jagannath Purohit (1923–2018), Marathi writer
 Keshav Roy (born 1926), Indian wrestler
 Keshav Samant, Indian bridge player
 Keshav Sathe (1928–2012), Indian tabla player
 Keshav K. Singh, American cellular biologist
 Keshav Prasad Upadhyaya (born 1944), Nepalese judge

Surname
 Amrit Keshav Nayak (1877– 1907), Actor and director
  Umakant Keshav Apte (1903– 1971), First pracharaks
  Bal Keshav Thackeray (1926–2012), Indian politician who founded the Shiv Sena
 Dhondo Keshav Karve (1858–1962), Social reformer in India
 Lee Keshav (born 1992), Indian Racing Driver
  Keerthi Keshav Bhat (born 1999), Indian Actress
  Krishnaji Keshav Damle (1866–1905), Marathi poet
  Mangesh Keshav Padgaoankar (1929– 2015), Marathi poet
 Payyavula Keshav (born 1965), Member of the Legislative Assembly of the Indian
 Pralhad Keshav Atre (1898–1969), Marathi writer and poet
 Srinivasan Keshav (born 1965), American-Canadian Computer Scientist from India.
 Vijay Keshav Gokhale(born 1959), Indian diplomat and the 32nd Foreign Secretary of India.

Indian masculine given names